Elk Township may refer to the following places in the United States:

 Elk Township, Jackson County, Illinois
 Elk Township, Buena Vista County, Iowa
 Elk Township, Clayton County, Iowa
 Elk Township, Lake County, Michigan
 Elk Township, Sanilac County, Michigan
 Elk Township, Minnesota
 Elk Township, Stoddard County, Missouri
 Elk Township, Saunders County, Nebraska
 Elk Township, New Jersey
 Elk Township, Ashe County, North Carolina
 Elk Township, Noble County, Ohio
 Elk Township, Vinton County, Ohio
 Elk Township, Chester County, Pennsylvania
 Elk Township, Clarion County, Pennsylvania
 Elk Township, Tioga County, Pennsylvania
 Elk Township, Warren County, Pennsylvania

See also 
 Elkland Township (disambiguation)
 

Township name disambiguation pages